The 1990–91 NBA season was the 76ers 42nd season in the National Basketball Association, and 28th season in Philadelphia. During the off-season, the Sixers acquired 7' 7" center Manute Bol from the Golden State Warriors, and signed free agent Ricky Green. The Sixers got off to a 19–8 start to the season, but would lose 10 of their next 16 games. Johnny Dawkins sustained a major knee injury early in the season after only just four games, and was replaced by Green as starting point guard, while Mike Gminski was traded to the Charlotte Hornets in exchange for Armen Gilliam at midseason. However, the team posted a 7-game winning streak between February and March, held a 25–21 record at the All-Star break, and finished second in the Atlantic Division with a record of 44–38, which was nine wins less than the previous season.

Charles Barkley averaged 27.6 points, 10.1 rebounds and 1.6 steals per game, and was named to the All-NBA First Team, while Hersey Hawkins finished second on the team in scoring with 22.1 points, and led them with 2.2 steals per game. Barkley and Hawkins were both selected for the 1991 NBA All-Star Game, in which Barkley was named the game's MVP. In addition, sixth man Ron Anderson provided the team with 14.6 points per game off the bench, while Green contributed 10.0 points and 5.2 assists per game, Rick Mahorn provided with 8.9 points and 7.8 rebounds per game, and Bol led the team with 3.0 blocks per game. Barkley also finished in fourth place in Most Valuable Player voting.

In the playoffs, the Sixers swept the 4th-seeded Milwaukee Bucks in the Eastern Conference First Round, but for the second consecutive year, they would be eliminated by Michael Jordan and the Chicago Bulls 4–1 in the Eastern Conference Semi-finals. The Bulls would reach the NBA Finals for the first time, and defeat the Los Angeles Lakers in five games, winning their first ever championship.

This season would be the last playoff appearance for the Sixers until 1999. The seven consecutive seasons in which they did not make the playoffs during this span were more than the franchise had missed in total since their inaugural season of 1950, five (missed playoffs in 1972-1975, and in 1988). Following the season, Mahorn left to play overseas in Italy, and Green retired.

Draft picks

Roster

Regular season

Season standings

y - clinched division title
x - clinched playoff spot

z - clinched division title
y - clinched division title
x - clinched playoff spot

Record vs. opponents

Game log

Playoffs

|- align="center" bgcolor="#ccffcc"
| 1
| April 25
| @ Milwaukee
| W 99–90
| Hersey Hawkins (25)
| Barkley, Mahorn (8)
| Charles Barkley (5)
| Bradley Center13,587
| 1–0
|- align="center" bgcolor="#ccffcc"
| 2
| April 27
| @ Milwaukee
| W 116–112 (OT)
| Ron Anderson (24)
| Charles Barkley (13)
| Charles Barkley (10)
| Bradley Center15,623
| 2–0
|- align="center" bgcolor="#ccffcc"
| 3
| April 30
| Milwaukee
| W 121–100
| Charles Barkley (30)
| Charles Barkley (12)
| Hawkins, Barkley (6)
| Spectrum16,239
| 3–0
|-

|- align="center" bgcolor="#ffcccc"
| 1
| May 4
| @ Chicago
| L 92–105
| Charles Barkley (34)
| Charles Barkley (11)
| Hawkins, Anderson (3)
| Chicago Stadium18,676
| 0–1
|- align="center" bgcolor="#ffcccc"
| 2
| May 6
| @ Chicago
| L 100–112
| Hersey Hawkins (30)
| Charles Barkley (9)
| Hersey Hawkins (7)
| Chicago Stadium18,676
| 0–2
|- align="center" bgcolor="#ccffcc"
| 3
| May 10
| Chicago
| W 99–97
| Hersey Hawkins (29)
| Armen Gilliam (11)
| Barkley, Turner (7)
| Spectrum18,168
| 1–2
|- align="center" bgcolor="#ffcccc"
| 4
| May 12
| Chicago
| L 85–101
| Charles Barkley (25)
| Charles Barkley (14)
| Charles Barkley (6)
| Spectrum17,514
| 1–3
|- align="center" bgcolor="#ffcccc"
| 5
| May 14
| @ Chicago
| L 95–100
| Charles Barkley (30)
| Charles Barkley (8)
| Charles Barkley (7)
| Chicago Stadium18,676
| 1–4
|-

Player statistics

Awards and Records
 Charles Barkley, All-NBA First Team

See also
 1990–91 NBA season

References

External links
 1990-91 Philadelphia 76ers Statistics

Philadelphia 76ers seasons
Philadelphia
Philadelphia
Philadelphia